Hugo H. Huntzinger (1934, Los Angeles, California — November 22, 1993, Hilo, Hawaii) — long time National Park Service executive in Hawaii, chief ranger at the United States National Parks.

Biography 
He was born in 1934 in Los Angeles in family of Harold and Sophia S. Huntzinger. He has brother, David and sister, Sonya (Hager). His grandmother came to USA from Pinsk, Russian Empire, so he traveled to see Russia in summer 1992.

Graduated of San Jose State University as а geologist. He collected minerals and rocks from all over the world, and even sell and exchange them in Hilo farmers market.

He served in the United States Army in Korea, where he met his wife.

In 1990th he was member of the Rotary Club in Hawaii. Supported PSI Seminars in Hawaii.

National Park Service career 

From 1957 he was with the National Park Service for 36 years in his career.

From August 2, 1970 till May 25, 1974 he was superintendent of the Coronado National Memorial. In 1971 he updated the National Park Service policy.

From May 26, 1974 till December 19, 1987 he was Haleakala National Park superintendent. He established goat control program at the Haleaka National Park and reduce its number from 4000 to 400. He established strong programs in biological preservation.

From December 20, 1987 he served as Hawaii Volcanoes National Park superintendent

Huntzinger was an opponent of noisy stressful to the nature helicopter sight-seeing operations in both parks.

He also believes that the proposed Commercial Satellite Launching Facility represents a "direct threat" to this natural heritage site.

He died in the morning November 22, 1993 while en route to Hilo Hospital. His memorial service held in November 27, on the edge of Halemaʻumaʻu, Kilauea Overlook, Crater Rim Drive of Hawaii Volcanoes.

Family 
With his wife Kyung Ja, he had a son, Lorenz, and a daughter, Frances Rizzo.

Organizations 
Member of organisations:
 Rotary Club
 Psi world

Bibliography 
 Huntzinger H. H. Newsletter concerning results of Kipahulu-Seven Pools Public Workshops. 1975. Nov. 3.
 Huntzinger H. H. Oheʻo final development concept plan United States: Haleakala National Park (Hawaii). National Park Service, 1977.

Literature 
He was mentioned and acknowledged in papers:
 Baker J. K., Reeser D. W. Goat management problems in Hawaii Volcanoes National Park: a history, analysis, and management plan. Natural Resources Report No. 2, National Park Service, 1972. 22 p.
 Scott J. M. Hawaii's Upland Forests // Science New Series, Vol. 220, No. 4601 (Jun. 3, 1983), p. 1002.
 James H. F., Olson S. L. Descriptions of Thirty-Two New Species of Birds from the Hawaiian Islands: Part II. Passeriformes. Ornithological Monographs No. 46. 1991, pp. 1–88.
 Kjargaard J. Some aspects of Feral Goat Distribution in Haleakala National Park. Report No. 52 Hawaii. University of Hawaii At Manoa. 1984. 19 p.
 Tolson H. A.,  Baker H. W., Danz H. P.Historic Listing of National Park Service Officials: May 1, 1991. U.S. Department of the Interior, National Park Service, 1991. 231 p.
 Engledow J. Haleakalā, a History of the Maui Mountain. Maui Island Press, 2012. 177 p.
 Friends of Haleakalä National Park. 2012. Spring. (with photo show Hugo Huntzinger inspecting Kaupö pali on page 8).

See also 
 Haleakala National Park
 Hawaii Volcanoes National Park
 National Park Service

References

External links

 Historic Listing of National Park Service Officials: Superintendents of National Park System Areas, Hawaii. Last Modified: 2000.

1934 births
1993 deaths
People from Los Angeles
People from Hawaii
20th-century American geologists
National Park Service personnel